Tachinus corticinus is a species of crab-like rove beetle in the family Staphylinidae.

References

Further reading

External links

 

Tachyporinae
Beetles described in 1802